Fudbalski Klub Borac Zrenjanin (Serbian Cyrillic: Фудбалски Клуб Борац Зрењанин), commonly known as Borac Zrenjanin or simply Borac, is a Serbian football club based in Zrenjanin, Serbia. Club was founded in 1921. FK Borac plays its home games at K Borac Stadium. The club is currently playing in PFL Zrenjanin, the fifth tier in Serbian Football Leagues system.

History
FK Borac is founded in 1921. in Zrenjanin. The club is playing on their current stadium since 1955. They finished 2009/10 season third from top. Season 2010/11 they finished in seventh place and the next season, 2011/12 in eighth. The current season isn't that good, as they are last, 16th on the table with only 8 points from 15 matches.

Borac Zrenjanin
Borac Zrenjanin